Shivani Jadhav is an Indian model and beauty pageant titleholder who was crowned Femina Miss Grand India 2019 at the grand finale of Femina Miss India 2019 by the outgoing titleholder Meenakshi Chaudhary. She represented India at Miss Grand International 2019 pageant which was held in Venezuela on 25 October 2019.

Pageant History

Miss Diva 2015
Shivani participated in Miss Diva - Miss India Universe 2015 pageant where she got eliminated in episode 5 during the preliminary round.

Femina Miss India 2019
Shivani  was crowned as Femina Miss Grand India 2019 by the outgoing titleholder Meenakshi Chaudhary on 15 June 2019 at Sardar Vallabhbhai Patel Indoor Stadium, Mumbai. Previously, she was crowned as Femina Miss India Chhattisgarh 2019 on 23 April 2019. During the competition, she was crowned Miss Body beautiful award.

Miss Grand International 2019
Shivani represented India at Miss Grand International 2019 pageant in Venezuela, where she went unplaced.

References

External links

Femina Miss India winners
Indian beauty pageant winners
Living people
Female models from Chhattisgarh
1999 births